American Landscape may refer to:

 American Landscape (David Benoit album), 1997
 American Landscape (Bruce Barth album), 2003